Manchal is a town is a suburb of Hyderabad in Ranga Reddy district of the Indian state of Telangana. It is located in Manchal mandal of Ibrahimpatnam revenue division.

References 

Villages in Ranga Reddy district
Gram panchayats in Telangana